Rod Rocket is the first animated cartoon with production credited to Filmation, debuting in syndication in 1963. The show was produced in five-minute cliffhanger segments, with five segments making a full story. Television stations could broadcast the single-segment version daily on their local children's afternoon show, or package them together to make 26 weekly half-hour shows.

History
Rod Rocket was originally produced by True Line, a small Los Angeles animation studio that subcontracted it the newly formed Filmation Associates created by Lou Scheimer and Hal Sutherland in 1963. Scheimer and Sutherland had met while working at Larry Harmon Productions on the made-for-TV Bozo the Clown and Popeye cartoons. They produced the series for SIB Productions, a Japanese company.

Plot
A boy named Rod Rocket and his best friend, Joey, are sent by wise codger Professor Argus on an exploratory mission in a spaceship called the Little Argo. He waits for them at home with his teenage granddaughter, Cassie. While in space, Rod and Joey constantly battle two bumbling cosmonauts.

Voices
The voice cast included:
Sam Edwards - Rod Rocket and Joey
Hal Smith - Professor Angus
Pat Blake - Cassie

Episodes
"Slave Labor in Space"
"The Lava Trap"
"Lost in a Lunar Mist"
"Lights On"
"The Acid Test"

References

External links

Rod Rocket at Toon Tracker

1960s American animated television series
1963 American television series debuts
1963 American television series endings
American children's animated space adventure television series
Television series by Filmation
Television series by MGM Television
First-run syndicated television programs in the United States